Attorney General O'Connor may refer to:

Charles O'Connor (judge) (1854–1928), Attorney-General for Ireland
James O'Connor (Irish judge) (1872–1931), Attorney-General for Ireland
James L. O'Connor (1858–1931), Attorney General of Wisconsin
Kenneth O'Connor (1896–1985),  Attorney General of Nyasaland, Attorney General of the Malayan Union, and Attorney General of Kenya

See also
Herbert O'Conor (1896–1960), Attorney General of Maryland
James Conner (general) (1829–1883), Attorney General of South Carolina
Clare E. Connors (born 1974), Attorney General of Hawaii